Samuel J. Steiner (born 18 September 1946 in North Lima, Ohio) is an American-Canadian historian, author, and archivist. Steiner moved to Canada in 1968 as a draft resister, where he became a historian and archivist at Conrad Grebel University College in Waterloo, Ontario and was the founding editor of the Global Anabaptist Mennonite Encyclopedia. He has authored five books about Mennonite history, including a biography of Jacob Yost Shantz and is considered an authority on Ontario Mennonite history.

Works

References

20th-century Canadian historians
Canadian Mennonites
American Mennonites
Mennonite writers
1946 births
American emigrants to Canada
Living people
21st-century Canadian historians
Historians of the Regional Municipality of Waterloo